Jan Józef Wojnarski (1 December 1879, Tarnów - 14 October 1937, Kraków) was a Polish painter, graphic artist and art professor.

Biography
His father was a church organist. From 1902, he studied at the Kraków Academy of Fine Arts, under the tutelage of Florian Cynk, Jan Stanisławski and Leon Wyczółkowski. During the years 1904 and 1905, he made a study trip to Italy. After returning, he studied graphics with Józef Pankiewicz.

From 1911, he worked at the Kraków Academy; initially as a junior assistant, then full assistant and, finally, as Professor of Graphic Arts from 1929. Most of his works are small scale landscapes, which show the influence of Stanisławski.  

Those landscapes received numerous awards at national and international exhibitions. In 1937, he won a gold medal at the Exposition Internationale des Arts et Techniques dans la Vie Moderne in Paris. That same year, he was awarded the Officer's Cross in the Order of Polonia Restituta. 

His graphic works are also well known; etchings, lithographs and copperplates among them. His self-portrait is in the British Museum. Many of his works may be seen at the National Museum, Kraków and the National Museum, Warsaw.

References

Further reading 
 Beata Lewińska-Gwóźdź: Jan Wojnarski Malarstwo, grafika i rysunek, Bernardinum, Pelplin,  2004,

External links 

 More works by Wojnarski @ ArtNet
 "Ród Wojnarskich: Trwały gen artysty" @ Gazeta
 Genealogia w portalu Genealogy @ Potomków Sejmu Wielkiego

1879 births
1937 deaths
Polish painters
Polish male painters
Polish landscape painters
Polish lithographers
Jan Matejko Academy of Fine Arts alumni
Academic staff of the Jan Matejko Academy of Fine Arts
People from Tarnów